Haloprogesterone, sold under the brand name Prohalone, is a progestin medication which was previously marketed by Ayerst but is now no longer available.

Chemistry

Haloprogesterone, also known as 6α-fluoro-17α-bromoprogesterone or as 6α-fluoro-17α-bromopregn-4-ene-3,20-dione, is a synthetic pregnane steroid and a halogenated derivative of progesterone. It is specifically a derivative of 17α-bromoprogesterone and is similar structurally to medrogestone (6-dehydro-6,17α-dimethylprogesterone), medroxyprogesterone acetate (6α-methyl-17α-acetoxyprogesterone), and various other progestins derived from progesterone.

Synthesis
Chemical syntheses of haloprogesterone have been published.

History
Haloprogesterone was synthesized in 1960 and was introduced for medical use by 1961.

Society and culture

Generic names

Brand names
Haloprogesterone was marketed under the brand name Prohalone.

References

Abandoned drugs
Bromoarenes
Diketones
Fluoroarenes
Pregnanes
Progestogens